Liebstadt is a town in the Sächsische Schweiz-Osterzgebirge district, in the Free State of Saxony, Germany. It is situated 12 km southwest of Pirna, and 23 km southeast of Dresden (centre).

References